2-Chloro-9,10-bis(phenylethynyl)anthracene is a fluorescent dye used in lightsticks. It emits green light, used in 12-hour low-intensity Cyalume sticks.

See also
9,10-Bis(phenylethynyl)anthracene
1-Chloro-9,10-bis(phenylethynyl)anthracene

Fluorescent dyes
Organic semiconductors
Anthracenes
Alkyne derivatives
Chloroarenes